John Witt (born August 25, 1969 in Elmhurst, Illinois) is an American baseball collector. He claims to have caught over 5,000 baseballs at professional baseball games over the past 40 years. Witt is also an author, baseball columnist and actor.

Background 
Witt caught his first ball at age seven, during a Chicago White Sox game at Comiskey Park in 1977. Over the past 27 years Witt has spent time working for minor league teams as a clubhouse attendant, concession stand manager, operations director and handling marketing and sales.  Witt has also made money editing math textbooks, and openly admits having sold many of the balls he has caught for cash.

Baseball collecting
Witt claims to have collected over 5,000 baseballs at professional baseball games in the past 45 years, starting in 1977, when he snagged his first baseball. Almost 4,000 of those are Major League baseballs (MLB). One hundred one of the MLB balls are actual game home run's from Major League baseball games.

On September 13, 1998, he grabbed Sammy Sosa's 61st home run at Wrigley Field in Chicago.  Witt was actually not in the ballpark that day but was outside of left field standing on the corner of Waveland Avenue and Kenmore St. The ball came out just missing the apartment building across the street, bounced off a man's shin and then rolled right into the glove of Witt.  Several regulars surrounded Witt and hustled him into a van for safety. Witt spent the next 30 minutes doing interviews, signing autographs and even had a visit from Jeff Idleson of the Baseball Hall of Fame to authenticate that ball. Initially turning down a reported five-figure sum, Witt later sold the ball for $7,500 to a collector in Chicago, who promptly returned the ball to Sosa one week later.

Witt has also caught other memorable and historic home runs over the years, including Dave Winfield's 450th career home run, Bob Boone's 100th career home run, Dante Bichette's first career home run, Derek Jeter's home run in game 3 of the 2003 ALCS, Kevin Mitchell's home run in the 1989 NLCS and home runs hit by Baseball Hall of Famer Eddie Murray from both sides of the plate in the same game in 1987.

Acting 
Witt appeared as an extra in several movies including a movie about baseball star Babe Ruth titled The Babe. Witt also appeared in the 2004 MasterCard commercial featuring Boston Red Sox fans telling what they would give up for World Series tickets.

Charitable work 
In 2009 Witt worked with the Orange County, California chapter of Mothers Against Drunk Driving to create Baseballs 4 MADD. Through Witt's ballhawking pledges were made for each baseball that he caught during the 2009 baseball season. Catching a total of 113 in 2009, Witt helped raise $778 for Mothers Against Drunk Driving's mission to stop drunk driving, support the victims of this violent crime and prevent underage drinking.

Writing
Witt's book titled, Taking Home A Piece Of The Game, was published by Createspace in 2009. Witt is also a columnist for the website Mygameballs.com and has written several articles for various other baseball outlets.

References

External links
 Official blog
 NPR Interview

1969 births
Living people
Baseball people
American sportswriters
Baseball writers
Collectors
American bloggers
21st-century American non-fiction writers